Saumya Daan (born 2 March 1982 in Mumbai) is an Indian voice actor who speaks English, Hindi, Marathi and Bengali and worked as a customer service assistant with Jet Airways until 2010, leaving to become a full-time voice actor.

Filmography

Commercials

Dubbing roles

Animated series

Live action television series

Live action films

Hollywood films

Indian films

Animated films

Indian TV series

Little Singham, he voiced Ballu, Chikki, and Professor Avishkar in this show.

See also
Dubbing (filmmaking)
List of Indian dubbing artists

References

1982 births
Male actors from Mumbai
Living people
Indian male child actors
Indian male voice actors